4-Amino-3-hydrazino-5-mercapto-1,2,4-triazole is an organic compound with the formula SC2N3H(NH2)(N2H3). The compound consists of a 1,2,4-triazole heterocycle with three functional groups: amine, thioamide and hydrazyl.  X-ray crystallography shows that this molecule is polar but with a C=S double bond. It is prepared by the reaction of hydrazine with thiourea:

2 SC(NH2)2 + 3 N2H4 → SC2N3H(NH2)(N2H3) + 4 NH3 + H2S

The compound has been used as a reagent for the colorimetric detection of aldehydes.

References

Triazoles